In the Battle of Myeongnyang, on October 26, 1597, the Korean Joseon Kingdom's navy, led by Admiral Yi Sun-sin, fought the Japanese navy in the Myeongnyang Strait, near Jindo Island, off the southwest corner of the Korean peninsula.

With only 13 ships remaining from Admiral Won Gyun's disastrous defeat at the Battle of Chilchonryang, Admiral Yi held the strait as a "last stand" battle against the Japanese navy, who were sailing to support their land army's advance towards the Joseon capital of Hanyang (modern-day Seoul).

The actual numeric strength of the Japanese fleet that Admiral Yi fought is unclear; Korean sources indicate 120 to 133 ships participated in combat, with an unknown number sitting out, up to 330 in total. Regardless of the size of the Japanese fleet, all sources indicate that the Japanese ships heavily outnumbered the Korean ships, by at least a ten-to-one ratio. 

In total 31 Japanese warships were sunk or crippled during the battle. Tōdō Takatora, one of the commanders of the Japanese navy, was wounded during the battle and many others were killed. The result overall was a humiliating naval defeat for the Japanese. Even after the Joseon victory, however, the Joseon navy was still outnumbered by remaining Japanese forces, so Admiral Yi withdrew to the Yellow Sea to resupply his fleet and have more space for a mobile defense. After the Korean navy withdrew, the Japanese navy made an incursion into the western coast of Korea, near some islands in Yeonggwang County.

Given the disparity in numbers of ships, the naval battle is regarded as one of the most tactically brilliant victories in the history of warfare.

Background
Due to Japanese intrigue taking advantage of the fractious politics of the Joseon Dynasty court, Admiral Yi Sun-sin had previously been impeached and almost put to death. He was instead tortured and demoted to the rank of a common soldier. Yi's rival, Admiral Won Gyun, took command of the Joseon fleet, which under Yi's careful management had grown from 63 heavy warships to 166.

Won Gyun was an incompetent naval commander who immediately began squandering the Joseon navy's strength through ill-conceived maneuvers against the Japanese naval base at Busan. In the Battle of Chilchonryang, the Japanese navy, with Tōdō Takatora in overall command, outmaneuvered the Joseon navy and virtually wiped it out.  Soon afterwards, the Japanese reinforced their garrisons in Busan and various forts on the southern coast of Korea, and began the second invasion.

With the Joseon navy taken out of the scene, the Japanese believed that they now had free access to the Yellow Sea and could resupply their troops through this sea route as they advanced northward. Five years earlier, in the 1592 campaigns, Admiral Yi prevented the Japanese from resupplying their troops in this manner and kept their ships holed up at their main bases in Busan harbor.

The Japanese had started the second war and renewed their offensive, laying siege and capturing the city of Namwon in September 26 and fighting the Ming Chinese army to a standstill in Jiksan on September 7.  The Japanese army then awaited supplies and reinforcements from their navy, who would need to enter the Yellow Sea to reach the western coast of Korea.  The army, thus supported by their navy, planned to make a major push to recapture Hanyang (modern Seoul).

Prelude
Admiral Yi Sun-sin was hastily reinstated as Supreme Commander of the Regional Navies after Won Gyun was killed at the Battle of Chilchonryang. Yi initially only had 10 panokseon ships at his disposal, which had been saved by Gyeongsang Right Naval Commander Bae Seol, who retreated early in the Battle of Chilchonryang.  Bae Seol had originally saved 12 ships, but lost two while on his retreat towards Hoeryongpo.  Two ships were brought by newly-appointed Jolla Right Naval Commander Kim Eok-chu, and by the time of the battle, Yi had acquired another warship, likely one of the two that Bae Seol had previously lost.  Thus, in total, Yi had 13 warships.  Although Yi only found 120 men initially, some of the survivors of Chilchonryang rallied to him, and he had at least 1,500 sailors and marines by the end of September.

At that time, King Seonjo, who judged that the Joseon navy had lost its power and would never be restored again, sent a letter to disband the navy and have its men join the ground forces under General Kwon Yul. Admiral Yi responded with his own letter, stating: "Your majesty, this vassal still has twelve battleships (今臣戰船 尙有十二, 지금 신에게는 아직도 열두 척의 전선이 있습니다). ... Even though our navy is small, as long as I live the enemy will not dare to look down on us (戰船雖寡 微臣不死 則不敢侮我矣, 비록 전선의 수가 적으나 미천한 신이 아직 죽지 아니하였으니 왜적들이 감히 우리를 업신여기지 못할 것입니다)."

Before the main body of the Japanese navy advanced into the Yellow Sea, they sent out a few probing missions with armed scouting parties.  At this time, Admiral Yi's fleet was south of the Myeongnyang Strait near Oranpo.  On October 8, an advanced scouting party of eight Japanese vessels staged a surprise attack, which the Joseon fleet drove off.  Yi retreated further north to Byeokpajin, on the northern end of Jindo island.  On October 12, Bae Seol fled (he would be found later by Joseon authorities and executed for desertion). On October 17, a Japanese scouting fleet of 13 ships launched a night attack which, after heavy fighting, was also repulsed.

By this time, through the reports of their scouting forces, the Japanese were aware of the presence of Joseon naval remnants that intended to resist their advance.  Well armed scouting forces alone were not going to defeat or scatter the Joseon remnants, so the Japanese began amassing a much larger fleet.  Admiral Yi's diary mentions reports of around 55 Japanese ships massing near Oranpo on October 17.  With Japanese naval activity increasing, Admiral Yi did not want to fight a major battle with his back to the Myeongnyang Strait, so on October 25 he decided to withdraw further north and hide his ships in the shadow of the hills on the opposite (northern) side of the Myeongnyang Strait, near Usuyeong (우수영).

Battle

Preparation

Admiral Yi studied numerous sites for his last stand with the Japanese navy and decided on luring them into the Myeongryang Strait. The Japanese would clearly enter the strait when the tide was favorable and so he did not want to fight south of the strait, with the current at the attacker's advantage.  Instead he wanted to fight in the waters just north of the strait, where the currents were calmer.  The strait had very strong currents that flowed at approximately 10 knots, first in one direction, then in the opposite direction, in three-hour intervals. Yi realized that he could use the unique condition as a force multiplier.  The narrowness of the strait would prevent the Joseon fleet from being flanked by the numerically superior enemy fleet, and the roughness of the currents prevented the Japanese from effectively maneuvering, forcing them to attack in smaller groups and making it difficult to close in with the Korean ships. Furthermore, once the tide changed the flow of the current would in effect push the Japanese away from Yi's fleet and the momentum could be harnessed to increase the effectiveness of a counterattack.

Yi's account
Early in the morning of October 26, the huge Japanese fleet was spotted by Yi's scouts as they deployed around the small bay on the southern end of Myeongnyang strait. Admiral Yi's fleet then redeployed out of their base in Usuyeong to block the northern end of the strait.  Yi described scouts reporting countless enemy ships in the morning prior to battle, with 133 attacking. In Japanese records, the ships at the front of their formations were the middle class warships called Sekibune, as the larger Atakebune could not fit into the shallow straits.

Yi's warships deployed on the northern end of the strait and dropped anchor.  Yi in his flagship advanced upon the vanguard of the Japanese fleet, which was commanded by Kurushima Michifusa.  For a time only the flagship fought in the battle. The crews of the Joseon fleet were made up of survivors from Chilchonryang and they were still badly shaken and intimidated by the overwhelming size of the Japanese fleet. Yi said in his diary: "My flagship was alone facing the enemy formation. Only my ship fired cannons and arrows. None of the other ships advanced, so I could not assure our outcome. All other officers were seeking to run, as they knew this battle was against a massive force. Ship commanded by Kim Eok-chu, the Officer of Jeolla Right province, was 1~2 majang (1 majang: approximately 390 metres) away."  For a time it looked like Yi's flagship was "... standing like a castle in the middle of the sea."

The flagship's ability to hold out against the Japanese vanguard eventually gave heart to the rest of Yi's fleet and small groups of his ships came to his aid.  First came a ship commanded by local magistrate An Wi and then several ships commanded by central squadron leader Kim Ung-ham. Seeing the success of the flagship and the handful of other boats, the rest of Yi's fleet joined in the fight.

The tide soon shifted and the Japanese ships began to drift backwards and collide with each other. In the confusion, Admiral Yi ordered his ships to advance and press the attack, ramming 31 Japanese ships. The dense formation of Japanese ships crowded in the narrow strait made a perfect target for Joseon cannon fire.  The strong tides prevented those in the water from swimming to shore, and many Japanese sailors who abandoned sinking or damaged ships drowned in the currents. Some Korean documents record the number of damaged Japanese warships, which also includes those not sunk but sustaining some amount of damage; however, the condition of the damaged ships is unclear. Having dealt a heavy blow to the Japanese, according to Yi's diary at this point the Japanese dared not approach his fleet, but though he wished to continue the battle the tides were too strong, the wind blew against him, and he was still greatly outnumbered, so decided to withdraw to Dangsa island at nightfall.

Tōdō Clan's account

The memoirs of the Tōdō Clan described the desperate fighting before the Korean ships withdrew.

Aftermath
Even after the victory, the Joseon navy was still outnumbered by the remaining Japanese navy, so Admiral Yi withdrew to resupply his fleet and have more space for mobile defense. After hearing the news of the heroic victory, many surviving ships and sailors who had been in hiding after the defeat at Chilcheollyang joined Admiral Yi's fleet. In Yi's report to the court as recorded in the Annals of the Joseon Dynasty, he was fortunate to gain a small victory after the disaster at Chilcheollyang, with which the Japanese momentum was blunted and they were prevented from entering the Yellow Sea. The victory also enabled the Chinese navy to join Admiral Yi in early 1598.  After the destruction of most of the Joseon fleet at Chilcheollyang, the Ming kept their navy stationed at important port cities to guard against possible Japanese naval attacks. The victory at Myeongnyang convinced the Ming government that they could ease security at their major ports and deploy a fleet to the Joseon navy's aid.

The Japanese navy was heavily damaged (while at least 30 of the Japanese fighting ships were destroyed, the total number of damaged ships, to include those supporting ships that may have sustained damage, was not clearly reported). Kurushima was killed, Tōdō Takatora was wounded and the Japanese suffered extremely heavy casualties, with a captured prisoner reporting half were killed or wounded. The Japanese navy continued with a minor incursion into the western coast of Korea, but soon withdrew to consolidate their holdings along the southern coast. In order to avenge themselves, the Japanese conducted a punitive expedition against Yi's residence of Asan on November 23, 1597 (14th day of the 10th month by the Chinese calendar), burning the village and murdering Yi Myon, Admiral Yi's youngest son.

Technical notes

Chain or iron rope across the strait
There are claims that Yi had iron ropes tightened across the channel between Japanese fleet groups, which severely dampened the Japanese numerical advantage. However, in Yi's war diary no mention is made of such a tactic.

Cultural references
The Battle of Myeongnyang is portrayed in episodes 95 and 96 of the TV drama series Immortal Admiral Yi Sun-sin, and in the 2014 film The Admiral: Roaring Currents, both produced in South Korea.
The final scene of the South Korean science fiction film Heaven's Soldiers takes place at the very onset of the battle.
A military science fiction short story, The Battle of Candle Arc, by Korean-American author Yoon Ha Lee is based on this battle. The character Shuos Jedao in Lee's series Machineries of Empire is based on Admiral Yi.

See also
 Force multiplication
 Forlorn hope
 History of Korea
 Joseon Dynasty
 Last stand
 Naval history of Korea
 Battle of Salamis – an ancient sea battle in which a small Greek fleet defeated a numerically far superior Persian fleet of invaders

Citations

Bibliography

 
 
 
 
 
 
 
 
 
 
 桑田忠親 [Kuwata, Tadachika], ed., 舊參謀本部編纂, [Kyu Sanbo Honbu], 朝鮮の役 [Chousen no Eki]　(日本の戰史 [Nihon no Senshi] Vol. 5), 1965.
 
 
 
 
 
 
 
 
 
 
 
 
  
 
 
 
 
 
 

Myeongnyang
1597 in Korea
Yi Sun-sin
M